George Kunkel (March 10, 1893 – May 18, 1965) was an American lawyer and politician from Pennsylvania who served as a Democratic member of the Pennsylvania Senate for the 15th district from 1937 to 1941.

Early life and education
Kunkel was born in Harrisburg, Pennsylvania and went to the public schools. He graduated from the Harrisburg Academy and Franklin & Marshall College in 1915. He attended law school at Harvard Law School from 1915 to 1917.

He attended Officer's Training Camp at Fort Niagara in New York and was commissioned second lieutenant in September 1917. He was sent to Camp Meade in Maryland and assigned to the 30th Machine Gun Battalion. He spent nine months at Camp Meade then in July 1918 was assigned to the 79th Infantry Division of the American Expeditionary Forces (AEF). He served in France during World War I for 10 months. He returned to the United States in June, 1919 and was honorably discharged.

In 1920, Kunkel graduated from Dickinson School of Law with A.M. and LL.B. degrees and was admitted to the Dauphin County bar.

Career
He practiced law in Harrisburg and served on the Dauphin County Commissioners Board. Kunkel was involved with the Democratic Party. Kunkel served in the Pennsylvania Senate for the 15th district from 1937 to 1941. He died at the Harrisburg Hospital from heart problems and is interred in Harrisburg Cemetery.

References

1893 births
1965 deaths
20th-century American lawyers
20th-century American politicians
United States Army personnel of World War I
Burials at Harrisburg Cemetery
Dickinson School of Law alumni
Franklin & Marshall College alumni
Harrisburg Academy alumni
Harvard Law School alumni
Military personnel from Pennsylvania
Pennsylvania lawyers
Democratic Party Pennsylvania state senators
Politicians from Harrisburg, Pennsylvania
United States Army officers
Burials in Pennsylvania
Dauphin County Commissioners (Pennsylvania)